Muhammad Akhtar Khan Kanju is a Pakistani politician who had been a member of the National Assembly of Pakistan from August 2010 to 2013. Previously he had been a member of the National Assembly from 2002 to 2007.

Political career
He was elected to the National Assembly of Pakistan from Constituency NA-155 (Lodhran-II) as a candidate of Pakistan Muslim League (Q) (PML-Q) in 2002 Pakistani general election. He received 103,209 votes and defeated Rana Rab Nawaz Noon, a candidate of Pakistan Peoples Party (PPP).

He ran for the seat of the National Assembly from Constituency NA-155 (Lodhran-II) as a candidate of Pakistan Muslim League (N) (PML-N) in 2008 Pakistani general election but was unsuccessful. He received 41,642 votes and lost the seat to Hayat Ullah Khan Tareen, a candidate of PPP.

He was elected to the National Assembly from Constituency NA-155 (Lodhran-II) as a candidate of PML-N in by-polls held in August 2010. He received 79,744 votes and defeated Nawab Hayatullah Tareen, a candidate of PPP.

He ran for the seat of the National Assembly from Constituency NA-155 (Lodhran-II)  as a candidate of PML-N in 2013 Pakistani general election, but was unsuccessful. He received 60,524 votes and lost the seat to Abdul Rehman Khan Kanju.

References

Living people
Pakistani MNAs 2002–2007
Pakistani MNAs 2008–2013
Year of birth missing (living people)